The 34th New York State Legislature, consisting of the New York State Senate and the New York State Assembly, met from January 29 to April 9, 1811, during the fourth year of Daniel D. Tompkins's governorship, in Albany.

Background
Under the provisions of the New York Constitution of 1777, amended by the Constitutional Convention of 1801, 32 Senators were elected on general tickets in the four senatorial districts for four-year terms. They were divided into four classes, and every year eight Senate seats came up for election. Assemblymen were elected countywide on general tickets to a one-year term, the whole Assembly being renewed annually.

In 1797, Albany was declared the State capital, and all subsequent Legislatures have been meeting there ever since. In 1799, the Legislature enacted that future Legislatures meet on the last Tuesday of January of each year unless called earlier by the governor.

At this time the politicians were divided into two opposing political parties: the Federalists and the Democratic-Republicans.

Elections
The State election was held from April 24 to 26, 1810. Gov. Daniel D. Tompkins and Lt. Gov. John Broome (both Dem.-Rep.) were re-elected.

Senator Nathan Smith (Western D.) was re-elected. Ebenezer White (Southern D.), Ex-Gov. Morgan Lewis, James W. Wilkin (both Middle D.), Henry Yates Jr. (Eastern D.), Reuben Humphrey, Philetus Swift and Henry A. Townsend (all three Western D.) were also elected to the Senate. All eight were Democratic-Republicans.

Sessions
The Legislature met at the Old City Hall in Albany on January 29, 1811; and adjourned on April 9.

Nathan Sanford (Dem.-Rep.) was elected Speaker with 64 votes against 33 for Samuel A. Barker (Fed.). Samuel North (Dem.-Rep.) was elected Clerk of the Assembly with 64 votes against 37 for the incumbent James Van Ingen (Fed.). Sanford soon became ill, and could not attend the session anymore, and on February 12, William Ross (Dem.-Rep.) was elected Speaker for the remainder of the session with 65 votes against 24 for Barker (Fed.).

Lt. Gov. Broome died on August 8, 1810, leaving the presidency of the State Senate vacant. The senators elected John Tayler (Dem.-Rep.) as president pro tempore (vote: Tayler 21, Lewis 2, blank 2).

On January 30, the Dem.-Rep. Assembly majority elected a new Council of Appointment which removed almost all Federalist office-holders, most of whom had been appointed during the previous year.

At this session, the Legislature passed a bill incorporating the Mechanics and Farmers Bank of Albany, and Solomon Southwick became its first President.

On April 8, 1811, the Legislature appointed a new Erie Canal Commission to continue the planning and eventually the construction of the Erie Canal. The previous commissioners Gouverneur Morris, Stephen Van Rensselaer, William North, Thomas Eddy, State Senator DeWitt Clinton, Surveyor General Simeon DeWitt and Congressman Peter B. Porter were re-appointed; and Ex-Chancellor Robert R. Livingston and Robert Fulton, who were running a steamboat service between New York City and Albany, were added to the commission.

State Senate

Districts
 The Southern District (5 seats) consisted of Kings, New York, Queens, Richmond, Suffolk and Westchester counties.
 The Middle District (7 seats) consisted of Dutchess, Orange, Ulster, Columbia, Delaware, Rockland, Greene and Sullivan counties.
 The Eastern District (8 seats) consisted of Washington, Clinton, Rensselaer, Albany, Saratoga, Essex, Montgomery, Franklin and Schenectady counties.
 The Western District (12 seats) consisted of Herkimer, Ontario, Otsego, Tioga, Onondaga, Schoharie, Steuben, Chenango, Oneida, Cayuga, Genesee, Seneca, Jefferson, Lewis, St. Lawrence, Allegany, Broome, Madison, Niagara and Cortland counties.

Note: There are now 62 counties in the State of New York. The counties which are not mentioned in this list had not yet been established, or sufficiently organized, the area being included in one or more of the abovementioned counties.

Members
The asterisk (*) denotes members of the previous Legislature who continued in office as members of this Legislature.

Employees
 Clerk: Sebastian Visscher

State Assembly

Districts

 Albany County (4 seats)
 Allegany and Steuben counties (1 seat)
 Broome County (1 seat)
 Cayuga County (3 seats)
 Chenango County (3 seats)
 Clinton and Franklin counties (1 seat)
 Columbia County (4 seats)
 Cortland County (1 seat)
 Delaware County (2 seats)
 Dutchess County (6 seats)
 Essex County (1 seat)
 Genesee County (1 seat)
 Greene County (2 seats)
 Herkimer County (3 seats)
 Jefferson County (2 seats)
 Kings County (1 seat)
 Lewis County (1 seat)
 Madison County (3 seats)
 Montgomery County (5 seats)
 The City and County of New York (11 seats)
 Niagara County (1 seat)
 Oneida County (5 seats)
 Onondaga County (2 seats)
 Ontario County (5 seats)
 Orange County (4 seats)
 Otsego County (4 seats)
 Queens County (3 seats)
 Rensselaer County (4 seats)
 Richmond County (1 seat)
 Rockland County (1 seat)
 St. Lawrence County (1 seat)
 Saratoga County (4 seats)
 Schenectady County (2 seats)
 Schoharie County (2 seats)
 Seneca County (1 seat)
 Suffolk County (3 seats)
 Sullivan and Ulster counties (4 seats)
 Tioga County (1 seat)
 Washington County (5 seats)
 Westchester County (3 seats)

Note: There are now 62 counties in the State of New York. The counties which are not mentioned in this list had not yet been established, or sufficiently organized, the area being included in one or more of the abovementioned counties.

Assemblymen
The asterisk (*) denotes members of the previous Legislature who continued as members of this Legislature.

Employees
 Clerk: Samuel North
 Sergeant-at-Arms: Thomas Donnelly
 Doorkeeper: Benjamin Whipple

Notes

Sources
 The New York Civil List compiled by Franklin Benjamin Hough (Weed, Parsons and Co., 1858) [see pg. 108f for Senate districts; pg. 121 for senators; pg. 148f for Assembly districts; pg. 184f for assemblymen]
 The History of Political Parties in the State of New-York, from the Ratification of the Federal Constitution to 1840 by Jabez D. Hammond (4th ed., Vol. 1, H. & E. Phinney, Cooperstown, 1846; pages 285-290)
 Election result Assembly, Albany Co. at project "A New Nation Votes", compiled by Phil Lampi, hosted by Tufts University Digital Library
 Election result Assembly, Allegany and Steuben Co. at project "A New Nation Votes"
 Election result Assembly, Broome Co. at project "A New Nation Votes" [the result was not filed with the Secretary of State]
 Election result Assembly, Cayuga Co. at project "A New Nation Votes"
 Election result Assembly, Delaware Co. at project "A New Nation Votes"
 Election result Assembly, Dutchess Co. at project "A New Nation Votes"
 Election result Assembly, Genesee Co. at project "A New Nation Votes"
 Election result Assembly, Greene Co. at project "A New Nation Votes"
 Election result Assembly, Herkimer Co. at project "A New Nation Votes"
 Election result Assembly, Jefferson Co. at project "A New Nation Votes"
 Election result Assembly, Lewis Co. at project "A New Nation Votes"
 Election result Assembly, Madison Co. at project "A New Nation Votes"
 Election result Assembly, Onondaga Co. at project "A New Nation Votes"
 Election result Assembly, Queens Co. at project "A New Nation Votes"
 Election result Assembly, Richmond Co. at project "A New Nation Votes"
 Election result Assembly, Schenectady Co. at project "A New Nation Votes"
 Election result Assembly, Schoharie Co. at project "A New Nation Votes"
 Election result Assembly, Sullivan and Ulster Co. at project "A New Nation Votes"
 Election result Assembly, Washington Co. at project "A New Nation Votes"
 Election result Assembly, Westchester Co. at project "A New Nation Votes"
 Election result Senate, Southern D. at project "A New Nation Votes"
 Election result Senate, Middle D. at project "A New Nation Votes"
 Election result Senate, Eastern D. at project "A New Nation Votes"
 Election result Senate, Western D. at project "A New Nation Votes"
 Election result, Assembly Speaker January at project "A New Nation Votes"
 Election result, Assembly Speaker February at project "A New Nation Votes"
 Election result, Assembly Clerk at project "A New Nation Votes"
 Election result, Senate President pro tem at project "A New Nation Votes"

034
1810 in New York (state)
1811 in New York (state)
1810 U.S. legislative sessions